Zhu Zushou (June 1945 – 1 January 2023) was a Chinese diplomat.

Life and career
Zhu served as the Chinese ambassador to the Netherlands from 2001 to 2003, and then ambassador to Hungary from 2003 to 2007. He was then China's representative to the Organisation for the Prohibition of Chemical Weapons from 2007 to 2011.

Zhu died in Beijing of COVID-19 on 1 January 2023, at the age of 77.

References

1945 births
2023 deaths
Diplomats of the People's Republic of China
Ambassadors of China to Hungary
Ambassadors of China to the Netherlands
Beijing Foreign Studies University alumni
Deaths from the COVID-19 pandemic in China